The following article presents a summary of the 1948 football (soccer) season in Brazil, which was the 47th season of competitive football in the country.

Campeonato Paulista

Final Standings

São Paulo declared as the Campeonato Paulista champions.

State championship champions

Brazilian clubs in international competitions

Brazil national team
The following table lists all the games played by the Brazil national football team in official competitions and friendly matches during 1948.

External links
 Brazilian competitions at RSSSF
 1948 Brazil national team matches at RSSSF

References

 
Seasons in Brazilian football
Brazil